Eamonn or Eamon Ryan may refer to:

Eamon Ryan (born 1963), leader of the Irish Green Party, minister for transport and environment 
Éamonn Ryan (born 1942), Gaelic football manager and player
Eamon Ryan, Irish civil servant and murder victim, see Murder of Eamon Ryan